Charles Arthur William Aylen (1882–15 August 1972) was an Anglican bishop.

Education 

Aylen was born in Wick, Scotland. He was educated at Bradfield College and Keble College, Oxford.

Career 
He was ordained in 1906 and his first post was a curacy in Henley on Thames.

He was vicar of Shiplake from 1913 to 1925. During World War I he was a Royal Navy chaplain.     He became a temporary chaplain in July 1916, and served on HMS St. Vincent. He was recognised as an officer of exceptional ability,a 'very fine example of all that a Chaplain should or could be'

In 1926 he went to Empangeni in the Diocese of Zululand as a missionary priest. He was the bishop of Zululand from 1930 to 1935.  While he was bishop of Zululand he married Elizabeth Hills. He was translated to the Diocese of St Helena and was bishop there from 1935 to 1939.

He was vicar of Aston Tirrold from 1939 to 1945 and Flore from 1945 to 1958 and rural dean of Weedon from 1947 to 1951. He was also a non-residentiary Canon of Peterborough (1946–1961) and an Assistant Bishop of Peterborough (1950–1963).

Family 
He married Elisabeth Margaret Anna Hills in 1932 and they had two sons and one daughter.

Notes

External links

 

1882 births
1972 deaths
People educated at Bradfield College
People from Shiplake
Alumni of Keble College, Oxford
Anglican bishops of Zululand
Anglican bishops of St Helena
20th-century Anglican Church of Southern Africa bishops